Bruce Lee Bosley (November 5, 1933 – April 26, 1995) was a former American football Guard and Center who played for the San Francisco 49ers and the Atlanta Falcons in a fourteen-year career in which he was selected to appear in 4 Pro Bowls (1960,65-67), and was named All-Pro 4 times (1959–1961, 66).

Collegiate career
. 
Bosley was a third-team Class B all-state fullback at Green Bank High School when he was offered a full scholarship to play for the Mountaineers.

Bosley was an immediate starter and contributed to West Virginia going from 5–5 in 1951 to 7–2 in 1952. In 1954 after a dominating performance against Penn State, Bosley was named Associated Press Player of the Week. He went on to earn consensus All-America honors as a senior in 1955. West Virginia won 31 of 38 games Bosley played in during his four seasons from 1952 to 1955.

Bosley, also an Academic All-American with a degree in chemical engineering, was invited to play in the College Football All-Star Game, the North-South Game and the Senior Bowl.

Professional career

The San Francisco 49ers made Bruce Bosley their second-round selection in the 1956 NFL Draft. Bosley played his entire rookie season at defensive end.

By 1957, Bosley switched to line and was the team's starting left guard, earning his first Pro Bowl berth in 1960. Two years later in 1962 when the team was searching for a center after an injury to starter Frank Morze, all-pro guard Bosley started at center. Bosley was named to the Pro Bowl again in 1965 and was honored two more times in 1966 and 1967.

Bosley spent another season with the 49ers in 1968 and a year with the Atlanta Falcons in 1969 before retiring.

Post-football

By 1967, Bosley was cultivating his other passion: restoring old homes. NFL Films visited his Hillsborough W.S. Crocker Estate carriage house for a show called “They Lead Two Lives,” which chronicled his career as both a star football player and respected home builder.

During the next 11 years he remodeled two other estates in Hillsborough as president of Interior Design, a home building, remodeling, interior decorating, furnishing and real-estate company.

Personal life

Bosley became part-owner of a wholesale electrical supply house in addition to his home remodeling business and was also well known for his civic and charitable activities in San Francisco.

Among his most prominent roles was membership on the board of directors for the San Francisco Annex for Cultural Arts, membership on the mayor's committee for the San Francisco Council for the Performing Arts, and a long-time volunteer role with both the San Francisco Film Festival and the San Francisco Ballet.

Bosley also served a stint as the president of the NFL Alumni Association.

He lived and thrived in San Francisco until his death from a heart attack on April 26, 1995.

Despite spending nearly 40 years of his life in northern California, Bosley never forgot his West Virginia roots.

“Things may change and your career may take you away in a different direction but there are things you never forget. I’ve never left my roots. They are in West Virginia,” Bosley told Charleston Daily Mail sports editor Bill Smith several years ago.

Legacy

Bosley is listed on the San Francisco 49ers “Golden Era” team from 1946 to 1969 and he was named to the college football's 75th Silver Anniversary Team in 1981.

Bosley, a member of the College Football Hall of Fame, was a part of West Virginia University's second hall of fame induction class of 1992. West Virginia University has announced that they will retire his number, 77, in a pregame ceremony on September 3, 2016.

More recently, he was named the state of West Virginia's 30th greatest sports figure in a poll conducted by CNNSI.com.

Dave Beronio, sports editor of the Vallejo Independent Press, once wrote of Bosley: “As a newsman of more than 40 years, I have found very few ‘Bruce Bosleys,’ those willing to contribute and participate during and after their days as stars. It would be difficult for me to believe that I will see his equal again in our area.”

References

1933 births
1995 deaths
All-American college football players
San Francisco 49ers players
Atlanta Falcons players
Western Conference Pro Bowl players
West Virginia Mountaineers football players
College Football Hall of Fame inductees